Langcliffe Pot is a cave system on the slopes of Great Whernside in Upper Wharfedale, about  SSE of Kettlewell in North Yorkshire. It is part of the Black Keld Site of Special Scientific Interest where the "underground drainage system which feeds the stream resurgence at Black Keld is one of the largest and deepest in Britain, although only a small proportion of its cave passages are accessible at present." Mossdale Caverns is also part of the Black Keld SSSI. A trip to the far end has been described as "one of the most serious undertakings in British caving".

Description 

The entrance lies within a shakehole where a small hole between blocks leads to a ledge at the top of a  shaft. This lands in a chamber with a narrow rift passage leading off which degenerates into the Craven Crawl,  of low, wet passage. At a junction with an inlet, the passage enlarges into Stagger Passage,  of walking and stooping. At the start of a deep canal it passes a passage on the left which is the main way to the alternative entrance of Oddmire Pot. Downstream,  of boulder-strewn streamway finishes where the water disappears under a wall, but a small passage leads into Boireau Falls Chamber, at the base of which it is possible to regain the stream. This finishes at Nemesis, a  shaft below which a route through a tight and complex boulder choke leads into Gasson's Series. Back at the low pool, a dry inlet passage of fine rift passage and chambers continues for over  before decreasing in size, and dropping into the large New Fearnought Streamway. Upstream terminates in a boulder blockage after .

A small hole in a shakehole leads on to a broken  shaft. At the base of this Strid Passage continues as a crawling / stooping passage for about  before joining Stagger Passage from Langcliffe Pot.

Geology and hydrology 

Langcliffe Pot is a solutional cave formed within rocks of the Yoredale Series of the Pendlian and Brigantian substages of the Mississippian epoch of the Carboniferous period. The Yoredale Group consists of a number of cyclothems, with sequences of sandstones, shales and thin coals separating limestones into well-defined beds separated by aquicludes. The upper part of the cave is formed at the base of the Middle Limestone and the passages run down dip towards the south-east, floored by sandstone. In Boireau Falls Chamber the stream cuts through the  sandstone bed, and then through  of shale into the Simonstone Limestone. Nemesis Pitch drops straight through this, and the Gassson Series is formed totally within the Hardraw Limestone.

Langcliffe Pot falls within the  Black Keld catchment area. Most of the drainage within the catchment feeds into Mossdale Beck which sinks into the limestone at Mossdale Scar. The water then drains down dip in the general direction of Mossdale. The waters of Mossdale Caverns and Langcliffe Pot combine at some unknown point, and resurge at Black Keld. Black Keld has been penetrated by divers for about —well short of Langcliffe Pot.

History 
Langcliffe Pot was first spotted in December 1935 by members of the Craven Pothole Club (CPC), and they made the first descent the following April when the first  of traverse in the downstream passage was explored to a pool. Soon after, they dye tested the Langcliffe Pot and Rigg Pot streams and various others to Black Keld. Another party from the same club descended in 1954 and pushed on for a further  along what is now known as Craven Crawl before turning back. In August 1968 a team from the Yorkshire Underground Research Team explored over  beyond the CPC limit as far as the Kilnsey Boulder Crawl. They weren't too impressed with the place, and handed over the baton to the University of Leeds Speleological Society (ULSA). The next phase of exploration took place in 1970 when the choke in Boireau Falls Chamber was excavated, and Nemesis Pitch discovered. A week later a route was found through the complex boulder choke at the bottom, and a further  of passages discovered. In June 1972 the system flooded whilst an ULSA diving team were on the far side of the Nemesis boulder choke, trapping them which resulted in a major rescue call-out. The party emerged unscathed after a 44 hour long trip. A second major rescue occurred in 1974 when five cavers became trapped on the far side of the Nemesis Choke after boulder movement.

See also 
 List of caves in the United Kingdom

References 

Caves of North Yorkshire
Wharfedale
Limestone caves
Wild caves